The Chungyo Department Store is a shopping mall in North District, Taichung, Taiwan that opened on 30 April 1992. Main core stores include Muji, Eslite Bookstore, Uniqlo, H&M, Jasons Market Place and various themed restaurants. The lavatories of the mall were featured on a list of the world’s top 10 public restrooms by the UK-based Cheapflights website.

History
On April 30, 1992, Chungyo Department Store officially opened.
On February 24, 1997, stocks began to be publicly traded on the over-the-counter market.
In 1999, a joint venture with a Japanese company established Chungyo Department Store in Beijing. However, due to problems such as losses, another mainland-funded group took over the operation.
On December 26, 2006, stocks ceased to be publicly traded on the over-the-counter market.
On January 9, 2009, the family card was officially issued.
On September 3, 2010, Chungyo Restaurant (formerly P.S. Popular Hall) opened.
On March 1, 2011, the Chungyo Titanium Travel Co-branded Card was officially issued.

Incident
On 25 June 2018, an 18-year old man named Chen leapt from 14th floor of Chungyo Department Store. Seven emergency vehicles carrying 25 firefighters and paramedics were immediately dispatched to the scene. When rescuers arrived on the scene, they found the young man had smashed through the ceiling of the first-floor cosmetics department and landed on a counter on the first floor. Paramedics found that he was initially showing no vital signs and immediately rushed him to China Medical University Hospital for emergency treatment.

Gallery

See also
 List of tourist attractions in Taiwan

References

External Links 

1992 establishments in Taiwan
Buildings and structures in Tainan
Department stores of Taiwan
Commercial buildings completed in 1992
Retail companies established in 1992